Venita Blackburn is an American author. Her first collection, "Black Jesus and Other Superheroes," won the 2016 Prairie Schooner Book Prize in Fiction. She is an assistant professor of creative writing at California State University, Fresno.

Life and education 
Blackburn was born in New Orleans, Louisiana and grew up in Compton, California. She earned her MFA degree from Arizona State University.

Career 
Her short story collections have been featured in literary journals including Story Magazine, Virginia Quarterly Review, the Paris Review,Los Angeles Review of Books and American Short Fiction.

In 2016, Blackburn published her debut story collection, Black Jesus and Other Superheroes,it received Prairie Schooner book prize . She was also named a finalist for the PEN/Bingham Award .

She published her second collection of stories, How to Wrestle a Girl, comprising 30 stories that explore themes such as grief, queerness, and societal forces. For this book, she was the finalist for Lambda Literary Award for Lesbian Fiction at 34th Lambda Literary Awards.

References 

Living people
California State University, Fresno faculty
People from Compton, California
African-American women writers
Literature by African-American women
People from New Orleans